Zina Garrison-Jackson was the defending champion, but did not participate this year.

Meredith McGrath won the title, defeating Nathalie Tauziat in the final 2–6, 6–4, 6–4.

Seeds
A champion seed is indicated in bold text while text in italics indicates the round in which that seed was eliminated. The top eight seeds received a bye to the second round.

  Brenda Schultz-McCarthy (semifinals)
  Nathalie Tauziat (final)
  Natasha Zvereva (third round)
  Linda Wild (second round)
  Lisa Raymond (third round)
  Lori McNeil (third round)
  Dominique Van Roost (third round)
  Laurence Courtois (quarterfinals)
  Miriam Oremans (semifinals)
  Meredith McGrath (champion)
  Naoko Kijimuta (first round)
  Christina Singer (quarterfinals)
  Gloria Pizzichini (third round)
  Gigi Fernández (third round)
  Els Callens (quarterfinals)
  Tatjana Ječmenica (second round)

Qualifying

Draw

Finals

Top half

Section 1

Section 2

Bottom half

Section 3

Section 4

References
 1996 DFS Classic Draws
 ITF Tournament Page
 ITF singles results page

Singles
DFS Classic - Singles